Jorge Giovanni Zarfino Calandria (born 8 October 1991) is a Uruguayan footballer who plays as a central midfielder for Spanish club Sporting de Gijón.

Club career
Born in Montevideo, Zarfino was a Boston River youth graduate. He made his senior debut on 12 October 2013, starting in a 0–0 home draw against Cerrito for the Uruguayan Segunda División championship.

Zarfino scored his first senior goal on 26 October 2013, netting the first in a 2–1 away win against Tacuarembó. On 30 June 2015, after featuring regularly, he moved to Primera División side Danubio.

Zarfino made his debut for Danubio on 11 August 2015, starting in a 0–1 Copa Sudamericana away loss against Universidad Católica. Five days later he made his first appearance in the main category, playing the full 90 minutes in a 2–0 win at Juventud de Las Piedras.

On 12 July 2017 Zarfino moved abroad for the first time in his career, after agreeing to a one-year loan deal with Argentine Primera División side Newell's Old Boys. However, the deal was cancelled by Danubio and he signed for Spanish Segunda División B side Extremadura UD on 5 August.

Zarfino helped in Extremadura's first-ever promotion to Segunda División in his first season, scoring three goals only in the play-offs, and was a regular starter afterwards. On 6 August 2020, after suffering relegation, he joined fellow second division side CD Tenerife on a one-year loan deal.

On 31 August 2021, free agent Zarfino signed a one-year deal with AD Alcorcón, still in the Spanish second division. On 8 July of the following year, after suffering relegation, he moved to fellow league team Sporting de Gijón on a two-year contract.

References

External links

1991 births
Living people
Footballers from Montevideo
Uruguayan footballers
Association football midfielders
Uruguayan Primera División players
Uruguayan Segunda División players
Boston River players
Danubio F.C. players
Segunda División players
Segunda División B players
Extremadura UD footballers
CD Tenerife players
AD Alcorcón footballers
Sporting de Gijón players
Uruguayan expatriate footballers
Uruguayan expatriate sportspeople in Spain
Expatriate footballers in Spain